The Pylojacquesidae are a small family of hermit crabs, comprising only two species in two genera. The family members differ from other hermit crabs in that their mandibles are chitinous and toothed.

Pylojacquesia colemani
It lives in the tubes secreted by serpulid worms of the genus Protula (Annelida: Serpulidae) in sandy areas of the continental shelf.

Lemaitreopsis holmi
Lemaitreopsis holmi was described in 2007, based on a single female collected on September 20, 1986, at  near the Isle of Pines, New Caledonia. The genus name Lemaitreopsis commemorates Rafael Lemaitre of the Smithsonian Institution, while the specific epithet commemorates the malacologist George P. Holm.

References

External links

Hermit crabs
Crustaceans described in 2007
Decapod families